Don't Play with Tigers (Italian: Ricchi, ricchissimi... praticamente in mutande) is a 1982 Italian comedy film directed by Sergio Martino.

Plot 
Three segments. Cesare Domenichini is a poor man who, to bring the family to the sea, builds an abusive hut on a nudist beach. The businessman Mario Zamboni, on vacation in Livorno with his wife and his daughter Aurora, gives in to the advances of Frau Kruppe, a rich German woman with a passion for card games. Alberto Del Pra, owner of a shipyard on the brink of bankruptcy, is able to get the assignment to build a super yacht for a wealthy Arab emir, on condition that his wife Francesca would stay a night with him.

Cast 

 Pippo Franco: Cesare Domenichini
 Lino Banfi: Mario Zamboni
 Renato Pozzetto: Alberto Del Prà
 Edwige Fenech: Francesca Del Prà
 Janet Agren: Frau Kruppe aka Evelina Krugher
 Adriana Russo: Maria Domenichini 
 Néstor Garay: Kuzz Viller aka Federico Partibòn
 George Hilton: Sheik Omar Abdul Youssef El Rāchid 
 Daniele Formica: Akim
 Annabella Schiavone: Adalgisa Cavallari 
 Pippo Santonastaso: Praetor  
 Riccardo Garrone: Admiral Ulderisi

See also       
 List of Italian films of 1982

References

External links

1982 films
Italian comedy films
1982 comedy films
Films directed by Sergio Martino
Films scored by Detto Mariano
1980s Italian-language films
1980s Italian films